Ostrovskoy is a rural locality (a khutor) in Sysoyevskoye Rural Settlement, Surovikinsky District, Volgograd Oblast, Russia. The population was 61 as of 2010. There are 2 streets.

Geography 
Ostrovskoy is located 22 km southeast of Surovikino (the district's administrative centre) by road. Blizhneosinovsky is the nearest rural locality.

References 

Rural localities in Surovikinsky District